Haal Khata is a festival celebrated by Bengali merchants, shopkeepers and traders on Poila Boisakh (the first day of the Bengali Calendar) by opening a new ledger.

History 
Mughal emperor Akbar established a new calendar based on the old solar Bengali calendar in 1584 to ease taxation. The Mughals used "Halkhata Mahurat" to collect taxes and the tradition of Haal Khata is believed to be originated from this. Haal Khata is a Bengali tradition that is over 430 years old. Haal means updating and Khata means ledger.

Celebrations 
On the first day of the Bengali year, traders close old ledgers and open a new ledger for the new year. Customers are invited to settle old debts and start fresh. The event is marked by a special Puja by the Hindu traders & shopkeepers. Seeking to improve their relationship with customers, traders give sweets, snacks, or gifts to them. The festival is celebrated in Bangladesh and West Bengal, and Tripura, India. It is believed to bring good luck to the business.

References

Cultural festivals in Bangladesh
Festivals of Bangladeshi culture
Cultural festivals in India
Festivals established in 1584
Bengali festivals